2CD-5EtO is a homologue of the psychedelic phenethylamine 2C-D, where the 5-methoxy group of 2C-D has been lengthened to an ethoxy group. 2CD-5EtO is a representative example of the so-called "tweetio" compounds discovered by Alexander Shulgin and briefly mentioned in his book PiHKAL.  They are homologues of the 2C family of drugs, where either one or both of the methoxy groups at the 2,5-positions of the aromatic ring have been replaced by ethoxy. The term tweetio was derived phonetically from the sound of the "2-ETO" derivatives. 

Many tweetio derivatives of various 2C drugs have been synthesized and tested, including the 2-ethoxy homologues 2CD-2EtO, 2CB-2EtO, 2CI-2EtO, 2CT-2EtO, 2CT2-2EtO, 2CT4-2EtO and 2CT7-2EtO, the 5-ethoxy homologues 2CD-5EtO, 2CE-5EtO, 2CB-5EtO, 2CT-5EtO and 2CT2-5EtO, and the 2,5-diethoxy homologues 2CD-diEtO, 2CB-diEtO and 2CT2-diEtO. In general, the 2-ethoxy homologues were all several times less potent and somewhat shorter acting than the parent compounds, while the 2,5-diethoxy homologues were far less potent and qualitatively milder even at high doses. The 5-ethoxy homologues however were of a similar potency to the parent compounds and much longer-lasting, with both 2CE-5EtO and 2CT2-5EtO lasting 24 hours or more.

References

External links 
 2C-D Entry in PiHKAL
 2C-E Entry in PiHKAL
 2C-T-2 Entry in PiHKAL

2C (psychedelics)
Serotonin receptor agonists